Western American Art includes artistic work which depicts the subjects related to the Western American region, and was treated as impoverished, unwanted and unworthy art before the twentieth century, during which period it achieved respectability as a rewarding region for studying. The term holds a characteristic of narration that is different from the Modern art which focuses on abstraction. For the narration, Western American art focuses on subject than style. Considering as a national art, the subjects are distinct from the European art, namely, there is no elements from other region like Europe. Cowboys and Indians are two well-known subjects and they consist the important part of artistic work of Western American art, demonstrating the daily life and activities of cowboys and American Indian in western American.

The development of Western American art was affected by the social, political and also economic factors in American society. On the one hand, these factors helped it developed, like the era of U.S. westward expansion; on the other hand, the progress of western American art was also restrained by them, like the industrial development, which spread the modern lifestyle in the West. Western American Art experienced both prosperous and unvalued period during the art history.



Background

The culture of cowboys 
Cowboys in American originally came from Spain in 1519. The Spanish established farm and stocked with cows and horses. Then, the native Indians were trained by the landowners to handle cows and horses for maintaining and developing the farms. During the 1700s, cow farms had spread into both north and south part to Texas, New Mexico and as far south as Argentina, which stimulated the form of native cowboys. During the era of U.S. westward expansion, cowboys played a remarkable role. They rounded up livestock that were transported by rail around the country for sale.

In 1865 when the Civil War ended, the need of beef increased significantly due to the large amount of army. Thus, the expanded need of meat encouraged the development of livestock industry, also directly stimulated the expansion of cowboys.

Cowboys in American then developed their own styles differ from the original Vaquero. Their special style of life and dressing is called western lifestyle. To protect them from burning sunlight, they typically wear large hats with wide brims; boots to help them ride horses and bandanas to prevent them from dust. In order to keep their legs unharmed from sharp cactus needles, some of them wear chaps outside the trousers. When they live in the farm, they usually share a bunkhouse with each other to prepare for concealed danger.

History 
Before the twentieth century, Western American art was not considered as important as it is in current decades. The paintings connected with the western American were described as impoverished and marginal quality for serious study. Therefore, because of the desire to distinct from the Europe in both the cultural and political aspect, there were some writers who started to explore a national art that would stand for the New World than the Old.

During the eighteenth century, the subjects of the paintings were mainly focused on the heroic landscapes and the artists aimed to achieve the accuracy of the scenario showed in the paintings. The Moccasin Error which is a factual error of a painting called The Death of General Wolfe, demonstrates how the artists during that period treated the accuracy of paintings. For this painting, Henry Laurens pointed out that the Indian was shown without moccasins which was unrealistic depending on the fact that the Indian warriors would not join in a fight without their moccasins, which they regarded as an indispensable part of their fighting equipment. Benjamin West, who painted The Death of General Wolfe, admitted this error and fixed it by added a pair of moccasins at the left corner.

In nineteenth century, the western American was considered as a symbol of freedom and unknown, encouraging artists to give support to the movement in the 19th century. After the Louisiana Purchase of 1803, artists and explorers were inspired by the changes to enter the westward which provided a stage for the young to challenge their talent. The later enter of the mature artists helped to form the integrated picture of the westward expansion, shaping the view of democracy value of American. Due to the expansion, the conflict and displacement of Indian showed up eventually. Hence, the artists who devote to recording the displaced life of Native Americans came to the stage of art history in western American. George Catlin, who gave up the law career, was an example of this. Catlin began drawing portraits of Indians in more than 50 tribes, also recording hunting scenes, tribal rituals and landscapes in his paintings. These paintings then became valued and historical resources because of the accuracy of details of the paintings. From 1830s to 1850s, the paintings turned to concentrated on the concepts of Native Americans as noble savages. With the increasing of conflicts between white settlers and Indians around mid-century, the portrayal of American Indian tended to be negative, for example, the description of Indian changed from "noble red men" to hostile savages. Thus, the major subject became that Indians would eventually lost and controlled under the white settlers during the late 1850s.

As the twentieth century came, with the development in cities and industries, the western area of American had comprehensive changes. The cowboys and buffalo had disappeared, the open range vanished as well. The modern lifestyle was introduced to this area. Therefore, the subjects brought up by artists of the period were to recall the "Wild West". The inspiration stimulated artists of the West to reply for the changes. Thomas Moran, the painter of western vistas, created the last panoramic canvas of the region, Shoshone Falls on the Snake River. This painting expresses the will of protecting western natural resource, however, after Moran visited this fall, a project for irrigation ruined the river. With the influence of industrial development, the artistic works in early 20th century inherit the feature of the old century. Nevertheless, the arising of modernism and the Armory Show of 1913 promoted the following changes in the Western American Art.

With the election of president Warren G. Harding and ending of the Great Depression, the western American rapidly developed during the 1920s. Modernism started to spread but there were more traditional depictions showed up dominating throughout the West. The art colonies in California and New Mexico provided artists a place to further explore the western American. Thus, artists depicted the West in increasing various ways. Maynard Dixon, American painter, changed to easel paintings of Indians and landscapes rendered in a nearly cubist/realist style from illustrations of the Old West. Paintings focusing on nature and animal are another way in which artists demonstrate the wild West. Carl Rungius, who was a nature and animal plein-air painter, is a typical example for this, therefore, he continued recording the western wild life over decades for this career. Sculptors also recorded the western American in their unique way, which through utilizing their views of the Old West to create the sculptures for animals, cowboys, indians, and frontiersmen. At the end of 1920s, the tendency toward portrayals of Indians and romanticised views of their customs declined, meanwhile, interest toward avantgarde ideas increased. In 1930s, the stock market crash affected the Americans negatively and inevitably influenced the style of artists during that dark period.

Artists

Charles Marion Russell 
Charles Marion Russell, also known as "Kid Russell", was an American artist of the American Old West, who used to be a cowboy in ranch. His cowboy background gave him advantages in his art career that he was familiar with the cowboy life and qualified to record the western history in which he played a part. Russell was unschooled and self-taught but he was recognised as distinguished personality in the area of Western Art. He created more than 2000 paintings of cowboys, Indians and landscapes of the West. During his cowboy career, he was actually not treated as a qualified cowboy but a storyteller and artist who expressed himself through the art and literary poesy. Even after Russell achieved recognition and acclaim, he remained the old traditions of the Old West and was devoted to the West before the white civilisation was imposed upon it.

Russell born in a big family and was the third of six children. He showed a deep interest toward the art since his childhood. According to his family, Russell had a native artistic talent. He spent an appreciable amount of time at drawing and modelling. Under the influence of western expansion, the slogan "Go West young man" was widely spread in Missouri. Therefore, a tendency to go to the West gradually formed among the young people. Living under this environment, Russell inevitably had a dream of adventure toward the Old West as well. At the age of sixteen, he went to Montana and worked as a cowboy.

Russell's artistic works covered a various subjects, containing the daily life in the West, historical events and the traditional activities of the cowboys. The harsh reality and drama on the drive through Montana supply a documentary artist with material for a lifetime of work. The roundup in Judith Basin during his cowboy experience provided the idea and subjects for the early artistic efforts of Russell, from which he gained fame as an artist. One of the first large oil canvases he attempted was "The Judith Roundup" which probably done in 1885. During the journey through the rough Montana terrain with beef cattle, they passed where bands of disloyal Piegans and Crows had recently finished a grievous fight. The herd was stopped by the red warriors who asked them to pay the tradition toll for each head of cattle when they crossed the Crow reservation. One of his famous paintings is related to these incidents, which is known as "The Toll Collectors" painted thirty-one years later in 1913.

Russell's paintings are representative among the artistic works of western American art, because he represented the views of the indigenous people in American instead of the non-native citizens' views. He was famous as a precise documentary artist with an exquisite sense of the West.

Frederic Remington 

Frederic Sackrider Remington was an American painter, who is considered to be one of the most representative artists of Western subjects. His paintings are mostly concentrated on the subjects of western American and the cowboys, Indians at particular the end of 19th century. He was closely involved in some determinant moments at which the image of the Western American was focused. Remington created over 3000 paintings demonstrating the West subjects in the less than 30 years of his artistic life. Because of the industrial development, the modern lifestyle and railroad started spreading to the West. To save the traditional lifestyle in the West, he devoted to the changes of center of interest that turned to the drama and conflict which considered as the essential part of the life of western American. His paintings mainly focus on the hard riding and hard fighting, especially at moment that the action present the maximum impact. It shows a tendency toward the narrativization of painting, recording the stories and reportage of the West. Remington maintained a sense of tension and drama in his artistic works to show the wild and natural features of the West.

Remington was in a military school when he was young, where he took his first painting lesson. He then attended the art school at Yale University but he quit after his father died. At nineteen, he had his first trip to  Montana and then started his art career in the West. He was recognised as one of the most successful Western illustrator during the end of the nineteenth century and the beginning of the twentieth century. He showed a talent in manage complex compositions and his artistic works were commented as modern and out-standing by some critics on which his style was mostly naturalistic. According to his paintings, he seemed to focus on the animals and people of the West instead of the landscape. Although Remington had a high status, there were some critics pointed out that he was weak and unconfident at the color which limited the development of his artistic career.

Selected works

Notes

References 
Buscombe, Edward. "Painting the Legend: Frederic Remington and the Western". Cinema Journalvol.23(4), 1984, pp.12-27. 
"Cowboys". HISTORY, https://www.history.com/topics/westward-expansion/cowboys. Accessed 21 August 2018.
Livingston, Phil. "The History of the Vaquero". American Cowboy | Western Lifestyle - Travel - People, 13 Feb. 2017, https://www.americancowboy.com/ranch-life-archive/history-vaquero.
May, Stephen. "Changing times, unchanging visions". Southwest Artvol.28(9), Feb 1999, pp.75-82. 
May, Stephen. "Proud Legacy: 150 years of Western Art". Southwest Artvol.28(8), Jun 1999, pp.40–49, 115–116.
May, Stephen. "The roaring twenties: Western American art- 1920-1930". Southwest Artvol.28(11),Apr 1999, pp.77-83, 121-122.
McCracken, Harold. The Charles M. Russell Book: The Life and Work of The Cowboy Artist. Garden City,N.Y.,:Doubleday, 1957.
Prown, Jules David. Discovered lands, invented pasts : transforming visions of the American West. Yale University Press,1992. .

External links 
Alexander Belyaev, Western American Art

American art
American art movements